QRM may refer to:

 Amateur radio Q code for "I have interference"
 Quick Response Manufacturing
 US Quevilly-Rouen Métropole (QRM), a French football club
 Qormi, Malta, postal code